Hua Yang De Nian Hua is a 2001 short film by Hong Kong director Wong Kar-wai that was shown at the 2001 Berlin International Film Festival.

It consists of a 2-minute-28-second montage of scenes from vintage Chinese films, most of which were considered lost until some nitrate prints were discovered in a California warehouse during the 1990s, set to a song from the soundtrack of Wong's In the Mood for Love (2000), a golden oldie by Zhou Xuan; this song gives the film its title. It is available on the Criterion Collection DVD release of In the Mood for Love as an extra, as well as various bootlegged VCD releases of Wong's features.

External links

Review of the Criterion Collection DVD of In the Mood for Love with screenshot of Hua Yang De Nian Hua

2001 films
2001 short films
Short films directed by Wong Kar-wai